Igo or IGO may refer to:
 Intergovernmental organization
 Igo language, a Kwa language of Togo
 Igo, California, a small town in the United States
 iGO (software), a satellite navigation software package
 iGo Inc, an American technology company
 I-GO, a car-sharing service in Chicago, Illinois
 Girawali Observatory, India
 Go (game), known as igo in Japan
 Isebe language (ISO-639: igo), a Papuan language of Papua New Guinea

People 
 Igo (singer), Latvian singer and songwriter
 Igo Chico, American saxophonist
 Igo Etrich (1879–1967), Austrian flight pioneer
 Igo Galama (876–910), potestaat (governor) of Friesland
 Igo Gruden (1893–1948), Slovene poet and translator
 Igo Sym (1896–1941), Austrian-born Polish actor and Nazi collaborator